Events from the year 1947 in South Korea.

United States Army Military Government in Korea 
 Military Governor:
 Archer L. Lerch (starting December 1945)
 William F. Dean (starting October 1947)

Events
 January 1 – The Korean Sport & Olympic Committee is recognized by the International Olympic Committee.
 January 5 - Lakhui Chemical(락희화학), as predecessor of LG Chem was founded.
 May 21 – The Second US-Soviet Joint Commission is held.
 May 25 – Hyundai Togun, the initial name of the Hyundai Group, is founded by Chung Ju-young.
 August 28 – The United States request the Korean issue to be handled by the United States, the Soviet Union, the United Kingdom, and the Republic of China in a four-country conference.
 September 17 – The United States submits the Korean problem to the United Nations (UN).
 November – The United Nations General Assembly recognizes Korea's claim to independence and makes preparations for the establishment of a government and the withdrawal of occupation forces.

See also 
 List of Korean films of 1919–1948

References

1947 in South Korea

External links

 
South Korea
Years of the 20th century in South Korea
1940s in South Korea
South Korea